The 2000 Prince Edward Island general election was held on April 17, 2000 to elect the 27 members of the Legislative Assembly of Prince Edward Island.

Premier Pat Binns' Progressive Conservative Party was elected to its second straight majority, winning every seat but one. This was an increase of eight seats from the previous election.

The Liberal Party, led by rookie leader Wayne Carew, only won one seat, and Carew lost his own by a substantial margin.

The New Democratic Party, led by Herb Dickieson, increased their popular vote from the previous election, but lost their only seat (Dickieson's own).

Results

Riding-by-riding results

|-
|bgcolor="whitesmoke"|Alberton-Miminegash
|| 
|Cletus Dunn1628
|
|Hector MacLeod1016
|
|Donna M Lewis137
|| 
|Hector MacLeod
|-
|bgcolor="whitesmoke"|Belfast-Pownal Bay
|| 
|Wilbur MacDonald 1611
|
|Ernie Mutch937
|
|Mark Hansen143
|| 
|Wilbur MacDonald
|-
|bgcolor="whitesmoke"|Borden-Kinkora
|| 
|Eric Hammill1900
|
|Lorne Sutherland1002
|
|Andy Dibling153
|| 
|Eric Hammill
|-
|bgcolor="whitesmoke"|Cascumpec-Grand River
|| 
|Philip Brown1118
|
|Rob Henderson1094
|
|Peter Robinson416
|| 
|Keith Milligan
|-
|bgcolor="whitesmoke"|Charlottetown-Kings Square
|| 
|Bob MacMillan1215
|
|Richard Brown1197
|
|Lesley Sprague291
|| 
|Richard Brown
|-
|bgcolor="whitesmoke"|Charlottetown-Rochford Square
|| 
|Jeff Lantz1433
|
|Ian "Tex" MacDonald1115
|
|Ken Bingham294
|| 
|Paul Connolly
|-
|bgcolor="whitesmoke"|Charlottetown-Spring Park
|| 
|Wes MacAleer1743
|
|Dianne Portter944
|
|Leo Broderick432
|| 
|Wes MacAleer
|-
|bgcolor="whitesmoke"|Crapaud-Hazel Grove
|| 
|Norman MacPhee1931
|
|Cecil Godfrey1223
|
|Tony Reddin 341
|| 
|Norman MacPhee
|-
|bgcolor="whitesmoke"|Evangeline-Miscouche
|| 
|Wilfred Arsenault1209
|
|Robert Maddix1126
|
|Leona Arsenault-Belaire 160
|| 
|Robert Maddix
|-
|bgcolor="whitesmoke"|Georgetown-Baldwin's Road
|| 
|Michael Currie1807
|
|Danny Campbell827
|
|Bruno Peripoli99
|| 
|Michael Currie
|-
|bgcolor="whitesmoke"|Glen Stewart-Bellevue Cove
|| 
|Pat Mella2399
|
|Viola Evans-Murley852
|
|Jane MacNeil 249
|| 
|Pat Mella
|-
|bgcolor="whitesmoke"|Kensington-Malpeque
|| 
|Mitch Murphy 2954
|
|Greg Campbell690
|
|Clarence Fraser 218
|| 
|Mitch Murphy
|-
|bgcolor="whitesmoke"|Montague-Kilmuir
|| 
|Jim Bagnall1379
|
|Larry Stanly Creed 865
|
|Glen MacDonald 85
|| 
|Jim Bagnall
|-
|bgcolor="whitesmoke"|Morell-Fortune Bay
|| 
|Kevin MacAdam1791
|
|Danny Larkin826
|
|Brian Curley 47
|| 
|Kevin MacAdam
|-
|bgcolor="whitesmoke"|Murray River-Gaspereaux
|| 
|Pat Binns1668
|
|Andy Clarey 687
|
|Deborah Kelly Hawkes 41
|| 
|Pat Binns
|-
|bgcolor="whitesmoke"|North River-Rice Point
|
|Donna Lank1673
|| 
|Ron MacKinley1830
|
|Irene Dawson 321
|| 
|Ron MacKinley
|-
|bgcolor="whitesmoke"|Park Corner-Oyster Bed
|| 
|Beth MacKenzie2135
|
|Allan Ling1223
|
|James Rodd287
|| 
|Beth MacKenzie
|-
|bgcolor="whitesmoke"|Parkdale-Belvedere
|| 
|Chester Gillan 1719
|
|Jacob Mal642
|
|Edith Perry 186
|| 
|Chester Gillan
|-
|bgcolor="whitesmoke"|Sherwood-Hillsborough
|| 
|Elmer MacFadyen1815
|
|Allan Poulton866
|
|Victoria Hill200
|| 
|Elmer MacFadyen
|-
|bgcolor="whitesmoke"|Souris-Elmira
|| 
|Andy Mooney1535
|
|Philip MacDonald726
|
|Betty Fay176
|| 
|Andy Mooney
|-
|bgcolor="whitesmoke"|Stanhope-East Royalty
|| 
|Jamie Ballem1992
|
|Eddie Reardon1080
|
|Leo Cheverie195
|| 
|Jamie Ballem
|-
|bgcolor="whitesmoke"|St. Eleanors-Summerside
|| 
|Helen MacDonald1626
|
|Wayne Carew1194
|
|David Chapman368
|| 
|Nancy Guptill
|-
|bgcolor="whitesmoke"|Tignish-Deblois
|| 
|Gail Shea1472
|
|Neil LeClair1068
|
|Reg Pendergast92
|| 
|Bobby Morrissey
|-
|bgcolor="whitesmoke"|Tracadie-Fort Augustus
|| 
|Mildred Dover1737
|
|Judy Hughes982
|
|Blair W. Kelly163
|| 
|Mildred Dover
|-
|bgcolor="whitesmoke"|West Point-Bloomfield
|| 
|Eva Rodgerson753
|
|Charles R. Adams403
|
|Herb Dickieson694
|| 
|Herb Dickieson
|-
|bgcolor="whitesmoke"|Wilmot-Summerside
|| 
|Greg Deighan1674
|
|Paul Hudson Schurman1246
|
|Gary Robichaud403
|| 
|Greg Deighan
|-
|bgcolor="whitesmoke"|Winsloe-West Royalty
|| 
|Don MacKinnon2203
|
|Peter McCloskey1078
|
|Marlene Hunt235
|| 
|Don MacKinnon
|}

See also 

2003 Prince Edward Island general election
List of Prince Edward Island general elections (post-Confederation)
List of PEI political parties

References

2000 election results

2000 elections in Canada
Elections in Prince Edward Island
2000 in Prince Edward Island
April 2000 events in Canada